Live at the Astoria, London is Steve Vai's first live solo DVD, filmed at the Astoria in London on December 6 and 7, 2001. It contains a feature-length audio commentary from Vai and the band.

DVD

DVD n.1
 Shyboy
 Giant Balls Of Gold
 Erotic Nightmares
 Blood And Glory
 Dave's Party Piece
 Blue Powder
 The Crying Machine
 The Animal
 Bangkok
 Tony's Solo
 Bad Horsie
 Chameleon
 Down Deep Into The Pain
 Fire
 Little Wing
 Whispering A Prayer
 Incantation (with drum solo)
 Jibboom
 For The Love Of God
 Liberty
 The Attitude Song

DVD n.2 (bonus features)
 Backstage
 Behind-The-Scene Footage
 Interviews
 Band Biographies
 Vai Discography
 Los Angeles Rehearsals

CD
Available only online, Steve Vai - Live In London features 12 tracks that Vai personally selected from the recording of his show at the Astoria in London in 2001. The audio contained on this disc is the same audio contained on the DVD.

 Shyboy - 4:08
 Erotic Nightmares - 4:19
 The Crying Machine - 4:33
 Blue Powder - 6:56
 The Animal - 6:54
 Bad Horsie - 8:09
 Down Deep Into The Pain - 3:18
 Fire - 6:03
 Little Wing - 4:43
 Jibboom : 6:29
 Liberty - 2:05
 The Attitude Song - 11:33

Personnel
Steve Vai : Guitar & Vocals
Billy Sheehan : Bass & Vocals
Tony MacAlpine : Guitar & Keyboards
Virgil Donati : Drums
Dave Weiner : Guitar
Eric Sardinas : Guitar ("The Attitude Song")

External links
 Steve Vai's homepage
 Favored Nations (label)

Steve Vai albums
2001 live albums
2001 video albums
Live video albums
Live instrumental rock albums